Tuscarawas Township, Ohio may refer to:
Tuscarawas Township, Coshocton County, Ohio
Tuscarawas Township, Stark County, Ohio

Ohio township disambiguation pages